Elstree Studios is a generic term which can refer to several current and demolished British film studios and television studios based in or around the town of Borehamwood and village of Elstree in Hertfordshire, England. Production studios have been located in the area since 1914 when film production began there. 

Films shot at Elstree include: Britain's first sound film, Alfred Hitchcock's Blackmail (1929), The Dam Busters (1955), Moby Dick (1956), Summer Holiday (1963), 2001: A Space Odyssey (1968), Where Eagles Dare (1968), Goodbye, Mr. Chips (1969), Star Wars (1977), The Shining (1980) and the Indiana Jones films.

Television shows shot at Elstree include The Avengers, Danger Man, The Prisoner, UFO, Robot Wars, The Muppet Show, EastEnders, Holby City, Who Wants to Be a Millionaire? and Big Brother. The music video for Queen's "Bohemian Rhapsody" was filmed at Elstree in November 1975.

Currently, two major sites remain in use in Borehamwood: Elstree Studios on Shenley Road and the BBC Elstree Centre on Eldon Avenue. A third, Sky Studios Elstree is currently under construction, whilst a fourth Millennium Studios still exists in a much reduced capacity where it trades as Studio 2000.

History and facilities

Despite being called "Elstree Studios", only one studio has ever been located in Elstree itself, the remainder residing in the adjacent town of Borehamwood. When the studios were being established, Elstree was significantly larger than Borehamwood. Nowadays, Borehamwood is larger, but the old names have remained in use.

The civil parish that contains the town was called "Elstree". The local railway station was originally known as "Elstree" (nowadays, it is called ""). The local telephone exchange was also called "Elstree".

Eldon Avenue Studios, Borehamwood

The Neptune Film Company opened the first studios in Borehamwood in 1914. Production ceased during 1917, and the studio was sold to the Ideal Film Company who used the site up until 1924.

During 1928, the studio was sold to Ludwig Blattner who connected it to the electricity mains and introduced a German system of sound recording. The Blattner Studio was leased to Joe Rock Productions during 1934, which purchased the site two years later. Rock Productions built four new large stages. The site was again sold, and taken over by the British National Films Company between 1939 and 1948, although during this period a large portion of the studio was taken over by the British government for war work.

During 1953, the studios were bought by Douglas Fairbanks, Jr., mainly for television production and were later sold to Lew Grade's Associated Television (ATV). The Eldon Avenue centre became the main television production hub for ATV. The smaller Studios A and B were used for schools and sitcoms, while Studio C was a drama studio. Studio D, with permanent audience seating, was used for light entertainment programmes such as the ATV Morecambe and Wise series Two of a Kind (1961–68) and The Muppet Show (1976–81).

When ATV was restructured as Central Independent Television in 1982, one of the conditions of its licence renewal by the governing body of the ITV network, the Independent Broadcasting Authority, was that ATV should leave any London-centric facilities and become more focused on the Midlands, the part of the United Kingdom to which it broadcast ITV programmes. They remained in operation by Central up until July 1983.

The BBC bought the Elstree site in 1984 to produce its new soap opera EastEnders (first aired on 19 February 1985). In addition to EastEnders, many other programmes have been made there including Top of the Pops, 'Allo 'Allo!, You Rang, M'Lord?, Grange Hill, Hangar 17 and Holby City. Most of the site is now devoted to EastEnders production, but Studio D is available for hire via BBC Studioworks.

Elstree Studios, Shenley Rd, Borehamwood

British National Pictures Ltd. purchased  of land on the south side of Shenley Road and began construction of two large film stages in 1925. The first film produced there was Madame Pompadour (1927). The company was renamed British International Pictures (BIP) and a second stage was ready for production in 1928.

Alfred Hitchcock made Blackmail (1929), the first British talkie at the studios in 1929. At the end of the silent-film era, six new sound stages were built; three of these were sold to the British & Dominions Film Corporation. BIP became Associated British Picture Corporation (ABPC) in 1933. During World War II, the studios were used by the War Office for storage.

In 1946, Warner Brothers acquired a substantial interest in ABPC, appointed a new board and decided to rebuild the stages. In 1969, EMI gained control of ABPC and the studios were renamed EMI-Elstree Studios. In 1969, Bryan Forbes was appointed head of production of the film studio (see EMI Films). His tenure was short-lived and marked by financial problems, brought about by deliberately withheld funding and failed projects. Forbes resigned in 1971. During the period 1970–73, when EMI had a short-lived production and distribution deal with the American Metro-Goldwyn-Mayer film studio, the facilities were known as the EMI-MGM Elstree Studios.

In 1974, Andrew Mitchell took over from Ian Scott as managing director of the studios but was almost immediately told to close the facility and lay off all the staff. This was halted, but only with significant job cuts and closure of some facilities. The studio's immediate survival was secured through the facilities being used for Star Wars (1977). This led to subsequent Lucas productions such as the Star Wars sequels and Indiana Jones franchise being made at Elstree and also brought in director Steven Spielberg. In 1979, Thorn Electrical Industries merged with EMI after EMI's debacle with its invention of the CT scanner, and the studios were renamed Thorn-EMI Elstree Studios.

The studios were put up for sale in 1985. Acquired by the entertainment and property company Brent Walker, most of the backlot and several facilities were demolished to build a Tesco superstore. A "Save Our Studios" campaign led to the site being purchased by Hertsmere Borough Council in February 1996 and management company, Elstree Film & Television Studios Ltd was appointed to run the studios in 2000.

The studios at Shenley Road are used for both film and television production, and the studios are the permanent home of BBC Studioworks during the redevelopment of Television Centre. Shows such as Strictly Come Dancing and Pointless are recorded there.

Station Road Studios, Borehamwood

A single large stage was built in Station Road in 1928 by Whitehall Films Ltd, but the company was wound up in 1930. In 1935, Julius Hagen, the owner of Twickenham Studios, bought the site and formed a new company, JH Studios.

In 1937, financial difficulties forced Hagen to sell the studios to MP Productions owned by producer J Banberger.

During World War II, the studio was used by the government for storage.

In 1950, the site was bought by J. Arthur Rank, who renamed it Gate Studios and made religious films.

Production ceased in 1957, and the site was sold to Andrew Harkness, a manufacturer of cinema screens. Harkness Screens moved out of the site in 2004 having established a global manufacturing base in France and the US and relocated its UK operation to a new production facility in Stevenage. The building in Borehamwood was demolished in 2006 to make way for apartments new properties, the development being named Gate Studios in homage to the former site.

Imperial Studios, Borehamwood

In 1930, the British and Dominions Film Corporation bought three new sound stages from British International Pictures Ltd on the adjoining site before their construction was completed, which they named "Imperial Studios". Alexander Korda made one of his greatest successes at the studio,  The Private Life of Henry VIII (1933), which starred Charles Laughton as the King. The film's success in the United States and elsewhere persuaded United Artists and The Prudential to invest in Korda's proposed Denham Film Studios.

Film production continued until 1936 when fire destroyed the three stages. British and Dominions made a substantial investment in Pinewood Studios at Iver Heath, Buckinghamshire, and moved production there. The support buildings in Borehamwood that remained after the fire were sold off to various companies including Frank Landsdown Ltd, which opened a film vault service. The Rank Organisation bought the music stage for the production of documentary films. It later became the headquarters of the film and sound-effect libraries.

MGM British, Borehamwood

Amalgamated Studios Ltd constructed a large studio on the north side of Elstree Way between 1935 and 1937, but its plans collapsed and the facility was soon sold to Rank, who never used it for making films. After a brief period owned by the Prudential, the studios were purchased by the American film studio Metro-Goldwyn-Mayer (MGM) in 1944 and was renamed MGM-British Studios. MGM sometimes leased the studios to other film companies including the 20th Century Fox-produced The Inn of the Sixth Happiness (1958), for which a large set of a Chinese town, complete with artificial lakes, covering some 500,000 square feet, was constructed.

Several stages were taken up with the sets for 2001: A Space Odyssey (1968) over its extended production schedule, and indeed Stanley Kubrick's film is sometimes blamed for making the studios financially unviable. The facility continued to be used until 1970 when MGM closed the studios. The American company formed a short-lived deal with EMI, while the site of its former studios was redeveloped for industrial use and housing.

Danziger Studios, Elstree

In 1956 the Danziger brothers converted a wartime plane engine testing factory into a film studio they called "New Elstree", which was located to the west of the Aldenham Reservoir. The  site had six sound stages and employed 200. It was used mainly for second features and television series, but was closed by 1962 and sold in 1965. The site is now occcupied by "The Waterfront" business park on the A411 Elstree Road.

Millennium Studios, Elstree Way, Borehamwood
Established in 1993, the Millennium Studios on the south side of Elstree Way (opposite the site of the former MGM-British studios) offered television and film production space together with associated services. Productions shot there include the first series of CBBC's The Mysti Show in 2004 and one year of Channel 5's Trisha Goddard in 2005. Millennium Studios relocated to Thurleigh near Bedford in 2010.

A single television studio, Studio 2000, remains on the Borehamwood site, and has been used for Rude Tube.

Sky Studios Elstree, Borehamwood
In December 2019, media conglomerate Sky announced plans to develop a new studio facility at Rowley Lane. The site is also expected to house post-production facilities and an on-site screening cinema.

Timeline
The following table lists all the various names of studios over time.

See also

 List of British film studios
 The Elstree Project, an oral history project capturing stories from crew members who have worked at the studios in Elstree and Borehamwood
 "Elstree" (song)
 Lists of productions shot at each of the Elstree studios:
 List of films and television shows shot at Elstree Studios
 List of films and television shows shot at Clarendon Road Studios, Elstree
 
 
 List of films shot at MGM-British Studios, Elstree

References

Sources
 Leslie Banks, The Elstree Story: Twenty-One Years of Film-Making.  Clarke and Cockeran. 88 pages. With contributions by Douglas Fairbanks, Alfred Hitchcock, Ralph Richardson, Victory Saville, Googie Withers, Anna Neagle and John Mills.
 
 Peecher, John Phillip (1983) The Making of Star Wars: Return of the Jedi.  Ballantine Books.  .
 Warren, Patricia (1983). Elstree: The British Hollywood. Columbus Books: London, .
 Warren, Patricia, (1983). British Film Studios: An Illustrated History.  Batsford.   .
 Welsh, Paul (1996). Elstree Film & Television Festival Programme. Elstree and Borehamwood Town Council.

External links

 The Elstree Project – "Oral history interviews, showcasing Elstree's rich cultural filmmaking heritage

British film studios
Buildings and structures in Hertfordshire
Television studios in England
Borehamwood
History of television in the United Kingdom